Michael Gene Strain (born December 2, 1959) is an American politician from Louisiana. He is the Louisiana Agriculture and Forestry Commissioner.

Strain is from Abita Springs, Louisiana. He is a veterinarian.

Strain joined the Louisiana House of Representatives in 2000. He ran for commissioner of agriculture in the 2007 Louisiana elections and defeated Bob Odom, the incumbent, becoming the first Republican to hold the position. In 2015, Strain was elected to his third term as commissioner of agriculture. He won his fourth term in 2019.

Strain's wife is also a veterinarian.

References

External links

1959 births
Living people
People from Abita Springs, Louisiana
Republican Party members of the Louisiana House of Representatives
Louisiana Commissioners of Agriculture and Forestry
American veterinarians